Wavinya is a surname. Notable people with the surname include: 

Maria Wavinya (born 2000), Kenyan model and beauty queen
Yvonne Wavinya (born 1996), Kenyan volleyball player